Robert Foquet (born 6 May 1905, date of death unknown) was a French boxer who competed in the 1924 Summer Olympics and in the 1928 Summer Olympics.

In 1924 he was eliminated in the second round of the light heavyweight class after losing his fight to the upcoming gold medalist Harry Mitchell. Four years later he was eliminated in the first round of the light heavyweight class after losing his fight to Juozas Vinča.

References

External links
profile

1905 births
Year of death missing
Light-heavyweight boxers
Olympic boxers of France
Boxers at the 1924 Summer Olympics
Boxers at the 1928 Summer Olympics
French male boxers